w/o or W/O may refer to:

Walkover
Warrant officer
Write-off
without
wife of

See also
WO (disambiguation)